Scott v. Harris, 550 U.S. 372 (2007), was a decision by the Supreme Court of the United States involving a lawsuit against a sheriff's deputy brought by a motorist who was paralyzed after the officer ran his eluding vehicle off the road during a high-speed car chase. The driver contended that this action was an unreasonable seizure under the Fourth Amendment. The case also involved the question of whether a police officer's qualified immunity shielded him from suit under Section 1983. On April 30, 2007, in an 8–1 decision, the court sided with police and ruled that a "police officer's attempt to terminate a dangerous high-speed car chase that threatens the lives of innocent bystanders does not violate the Fourth Amendment, even when it places the fleeing motorist at risk of serious injury or death." In a rare occurrence, the court accepted the presentation of video evidence of the high-speed pursuit. Such procedure is quite uncommon in the Supreme Court and was viewed as part of an interesting relationship between the Supreme Court and technology. The video had a strong effect on the Court's decision and is viewed as a major factor in how the court made its decision.  The author of the opinion, Justice Antonin Scalia, in a first-time occurrence ever, posted the video of the car chase online (for access to the video, see external links below).

Justice John Paul Stevens, the lone dissenter, argued that the videotape evidence was not decisive, as the majority claimed it to be, and that a jury should determine if deadly force was justified. He stated a jury should be used, instead of the case "being decided by a group of elderly appellate judges," a reference to himself and his colleagues on the court (this sentence is not in the text of the dissent, but he pronounced it while reading the opinion at bench).
 
Three law professors created an experiment based on the video, showing it to over a thousand subjects and then asking them whether they thought the use of deadly force was reasonable.  The study found "[a] fairly substantial majority did interpret the facts the way the Court did. But members of various subcommunities did not."  The study and the disagreement over the reasonableness of the use of deadly force was reported in the Harvard Law Review.

See also 
 Tennessee v. Garner, 
 Plumhoff v. Rickard, 572 U.S. ___ (2014)

References

External links
 
 Supreme Court Scott v. Harris video 
 Court-posted format (mp4 file).
 streaming version, and MPEG4 and MPEG2 downloads
 Analysis and editing of the Scott v. Harris video

United States Supreme Court cases
United States Fourth Amendment case law
2007 in United States case law
United States Supreme Court cases of the Roberts Court